The state funeral of Shinzo Abe, former prime minister of Japan and serving member of the House of Representatives who was assassinated on 8 July 2022, was attended by roughly 3,600 people within Japan alone and by around 700 international attendees. The funeral was held on 27 September 2022 at the Nippon Budokan venue in Chiyoda, Tokyo. Out of the foreign attendees, 49 top-level foreign leaders and 218 foreign delegates, including 101 ambassadors and representatives based in Japan, were present at the state funeral.

Japan

Imperial family
 Fumihito, Crown Prince and Kiko, Crown Princess
 Princess Kako of Akishino
 Princess Tomohito of Mikasa
 Princess Akiko of Mikasa
 The Princess Takamado
 Princess Tsuguko of Takamado

Political
  Fumio Kishida, Prime Minister of Japan, and Yuko Kishida
 Yoshihide Suga, former Prime Minister of Japan (2020–2021), and Mariko Suga
 Yoshihiko Noda, former Prime Minister of Japan (2011–2012)
 Tarō Asō, former Prime Minister of Japan (2008–2009)
 Yasuo Fukuda, former Prime Minister of Japan (2007–2008)
 Junichiro Koizumi, former Prime Minister of Japan (2001–2006)
 Yoshirō Mori, former Prime Minister of Japan (2000–2001)
 Hiroyuki Hosoda, Speaker of the House of Representatives
 Hidehisa Otsuji, President of the House of Councillors
 Saburo Tokura, Chief Justice of the Supreme Court

International

Royalty
  The Crown Prince of Bahrain (representing the King of Bahrain)

  Princess Sonam Dechan Wangchuck of Bhutan (representing the King of Bhutan)
  The King of Jordan
  Sheikh Ahmad Nasser Al-Mohammed Al-Sabah, Minister of Foreign Affairs of Kuwait (representing the Emir of Kuwait)
  The Emir of Qatar
  Prince Faisal bin Farhan Al Saud, Minister of Foreign Affairs of Saudi Arabia (representing the King of Saudi Arabia)
  Khaled bin Mohamed Al Nahyan, Member of Abu Dhabi Executive Council and Chairman of Abu Dhabi Executive Office (representing the President of the United Arab Emirates)

Heads of state and government
  Anthony Albanese, Prime Minister of Australia
John Howard, former Prime Minister of Australia (1996–2007)
Tony Abbott, former Prime Minister of Australia (2013–2015)
Malcolm Turnbull, former Prime Minister of Australia (2015–2018)
  Hun Sen, Prime Minister of Cambodia
  Azali Assoumani, President of Comoros
  Manuel Marrero Cruz, Prime Minister of Cuba
  Rose Christiane Raponda, Prime Minister of Gabon
  Narendra Modi, Prime Minister of India
  Albin Kurti, Prime Minister of Kosovo
  Moeketsi Majoro, Prime Minister of Lesotho
  Xavier Bettel, Prime Minister of Luxembourg
  Natalia Gavrilița, Prime Minister of Moldova
  Luvsannamsrain Oyun-Erdene, Prime Minister of Mongolia
  Aziz Akhannouch, Prime Minister of Morocco (representing the King of Morocco)
  Surangel Whipps Jr., President of Palau
  James Marape, Prime Minister of Papua New Guinea
  Nicolae Ciucă, Prime Minister of Romania
  Ana Brnabić, Prime Minister of Serbia
  Lee Hsien Loong, Prime Minister of Singapore
  Ranil Wickremesinghe, President of Sri Lanka
  Kassim Majaliwa, Prime Minister of Tanzania
  Faure Gnassingbé, President of Togo
  Nguyễn Xuân Phúc, President of Vietnam

Former leaders and officials
  Nicolas Sarkozy, former President of France (2007–2012)
  Christian Wulff, former President of Germany (2010–2012)
  Matteo Renzi, former Prime Minister of Italy (2014–2016)
  Rami Hamdallah, former Prime Minister of the State of Palestine (2013–2019)
  Didier Burkhalter, former President of the Swiss Confederation (2014)
  Frank Hsieh, former Premier of the Republic of China (2005–2006)
 Wang Jin-pyng, former President of the Legislative Yuan (1999–2016)
 Su Jia-chyuan, former President of the Legislative Yuan (2016–2020)
  Gurbanguly Berdimuhamedow, former President of Turkmenistan (2007–2022)
  Theresa May, former Prime Minister of the United Kingdom (2016–2019)
  Kembo Mohadi, former Second Vice-President of Zimbabwe (2017–2021)

Vice presidents and deputies
  Themba Masuku, Deputy Prime Minister of Eswatini
  Ma'ruf Amin, Vice President of Indonesia
  Mukhtar Tleuberdi, Deputy Prime Minister & Minister of Foreign Affairs of Kazakhstan
  Sara Duterte, Vice President of the Philippines and Secretary of Education
  Manasseh Maelanga, Deputy Prime Minister of the Solomon Islands
  Don Pramudwinai, Deputy Prime Minister and Minister of Foreign Affairs of Thailand
  Kamala Harris, Vice President of the United States of America (sent on behalf of President Joe Biden)
 Katherine Tai, United States Trade Representative
 William Hagerty, United States Senator (former Ambassador of the United States to Japan)
 Philip Gordon, Assistant to the Vice President for National Security Affairs
 Michael Mullen, former Chairman of the Joint Chiefs of Staff
 Richard Armitage, former Deputy Secretary of State

Speakers of national legislatures 
  Hakob Arshakyan, Vice President of the National Assembly of Armenia
  Annita Demetriou, House President of Cyprus
  Jüri Ratas, President of the Estonian Riigikogu
 Urška Klakočar Zupančič, Speaker of the National Assembly of Slovenia

Foreign ministers
  Abdullatif bin Rashid Al Zayani, Minister of Foreign Affairs of Bahrain
  AK Abdul Momen, Minister of Foreign Affairs of Bangladesh
  Albert Shingiro, Minister of Foreign Affairs and Development Cooperation of Burundi
  Alexandra Hill Tinoco, Minister of Foreign Affairs of El Salvador
  Pekka Haavisto, Minister of Foreign Affairs of Finland
  Mamadou Tangara, Minister of Foreign Affairs of Gambia
  Abdulla Shahid, Minister of Foreign Affairs of the Maldives
  Ian Borg, Minister of Foreign Affairs of Malta
  Marcelo Ebrard, Secretary of Foreign Affairs of Mexico
  Anniken Huitfeldt, Minister of Foreign Affairs of Norway
  Erika Mouynes, Minister of Foreign Affairs of Panama
  Adaljiza Magno, Minister of Foreign Affairs and Cooperation of Timor-Leste
  Mevlüt Çavuşoğlu, Minister of Foreign Affairs of Turkey
  James Cleverly, Secretary of State for Foreign, Commonwealth and Development Affairs of the United Kingdom

Other government officials
  François-Philippe Champagne, Federal Industry Minister of Canada (representing Prime Minister Justin Trudeau)
  Kamel al-Wazir, Minister of Transport of Egypt
  Edmund Bartlett, Minister of Tourism of Jamaica
  Javad Owji, Minister of Petroleum of Iran
  Han Duck-soo, Prime Minister of South Korea
  Datuk Seri Mohamed Azmin Ali, Senior Minister of International Trade and Industry of Malaysia (representing Prime Minister Ismail Sabri Yaakob)
  Sheikh Salim bin Mustahail al Mashani, Adviser at the Diwan of Royal Court of Oman (representing the Sultan of Oman)
  Sultan Al Jaber, Minister of Industry and Advance Technology of the United Arab Emirates

Ambassadors
  Candice Pitts, Ambassador of Belize to Taiwan
  Mohamed Abu Bakr, Ambassador of Egypt to Japan
  Cristóbal Adalberto Herrera Dubón, Ambassador of Guatemala to Japan
  Mohamed Elloumi, Ambassador of Tunisia to Japan
  Rahm Emanuel, Ambassador of the United States to Japan
 Caroline Kennedy, Ambassador of the United States to the Commonwealth of Australia (former Ambassador of the United States to Japan)
 Tom Schieffer, former Ambassador of the United States to Japan
 John Roos, former Ambassador of the United States to Japan<ref name="ReferenceB

Other representatives
  Wan Gang, Vice Chairman of the National Committee of the Chinese People's Political Consultative Conference

Other representatives 
  Verónica Alcocer, First Lady of Colombia
  Mikhail Shvydkoy, envoy of the President of Russia on International Cultural Cooperation
  Annie Lee, daughter of former President of the Republic of China Lee Teng-hui
  Wan Gang, Vice Chairman of the National Committee of the Chinese People's Political Consultative Conference

International organizations
  Charles Michel, President of the European Council
 Fatih Birol, executive director of International Energy Agency
  Thomas Bach, President of the International Olympic Committee

Notes

References

Abe, Shinzo
Abe, Shinzo
Japan politics-related lists
Tokyo-related lists
Chiyoda, Tokyo
Funeral